Walter Francis Montagu Douglas Scott, 5th Duke of Buccleuch, 7th Duke of Queensberry,  (25 November 1806 – 16 April 1884), styled Lord Eskdail between 1808 and 1812 and Earl of Dalkeith between 1812 and 1819, was a prominent Scottish nobleman, landowner and politician. He was Lord Keeper of the Privy Seal from 1842 to 1846 and Lord President of the Council.

Background and education

Buccleuch was born at the Palace of Dalkeith, Midlothian, Scotland, the fifth child of seven, and second son of Charles Montagu-Scott, 4th Duke of Buccleuch, and Hon. Harriet Katherine Townshend, daughter of Thomas Townshend, 1st Viscount Sydney and Elizabeth Powys. When his older brother, George Henry, died at the age of 10 from measles, Walter became heir apparent to the Dukedoms of Buccleuch and Queensberry. He was only thirteen when he succeeded his father to the Dukedoms of Buccleuch and Queensberry in 1819. He was educated at Eton and St John's College, Cambridge (M.A., 1827). In June 1833 he was elected a Fellow of the Royal Society. In 1841, he played in two first-class cricket matches for Marylebone Cricket Club.

Career
A great Scottish land magnate, Buccleuch was a Conservative in politics, and was appointed a Knight of the Garter in 1835 and a Privy Counsellor in 1842. He served as Lord Privy Seal from 1842 to 1846 and as Lord President of the Council from January to July 1846 in Peel's government, when he reluctantly supported Peel's decision to repeal the Corn Laws. After Peel's fall, the Duke's political career largely came to an end. In 1878 he became Chancellor of the University of Glasgow, a post he held until his death in 1884.

On 6 January 1842 he was appointed Colonel of the Edinburgh Militia (a regiment that his grandfather the 3rd Duke had raised in 1798). He was appointed an Aide-de-Camp to Queen Victoria for the militia on 19 March 1857. On resigning from the command on 20 May 1879 he was appointed the first Honorary Colonel of the Queen's Edinburgh Light Infantry Militia, as the regiment had by then become.

He joined the Canterbury Association on 20 May 1848. It was planned to build a town called Buccleuch in his honour near Alford Forest, but this did not eventuate.

Family
Buccleuch married Lady Charlotte Anne Thynne, daughter of Thomas Thynne, 2nd Marquess of Bath and Hon. Isabella Elizabeth Byng, daughter of the 4th Viscount Torrington, on 13 August 1829 at St George's church, Hanover Square, London. The couple had four sons and three daughters:

 William Henry Walter Montagu Douglas Scott, 6th Duke of Buccleuch (born 9 September 1831, died 5 November 1914), succeeded and was the father of the 7th Duke of Buccleuch.
 Lord Henry John Montagu Douglas Scott Montagu, 1st Baron Montagu of Beaulieu (born 5 November 1832, died 4 November 1905)
 Lord Walter Charles Montagu Douglas Scott (born 2 March 1834, died 3 March 1895): his son Walter married Alison Ralouka Heriot (1873-1935), granddaughter of Pasha Constantine Musurus.
 Admiral Lord Charles Thomas Montagu Douglas Scott (born 20 October 1839, died 21 August 1911)
 Lady Victoria Alexandrina Montagu Douglas Scott (born 20 November 1844, died 19 June 1938), married Schomberg Kerr, 9th Marquess of Lothian and had issue.
 Lady Margaret Elizabeth Montagu Douglas Scott (born 10 October 1846, died 5 February 1918), married Donald Cameron, 24th Lochiel and was the mother of Sir Donald Walter Cameron of Lochiel, KT.
 Lady Mary Charlotte Montagu Douglas Scott (born 6 August 1851, died 13 December 1908)

Rightful King of England 
King George IV spent some days in 1822 as the Duke's guest at Dalkeith Palace, the first visit of a reigning Hanoverian monarch to Scotland. Twenty years later, Queen Victoria also honoured him with a visit. The family continued to hold a high profile in royal circles, being invited to the Coronations of William IV and Victoria, with the Duke acting as Gold Stick.

The story goes that in 1879 the Historical Manuscripts Commission discovered an old black box amongst the Duke of Buccleuch's papers at Dalkeith, which was found to contain a contract proving Charles II had married Lucy Walter. In fact, the document meant the Duke was the rightful King of England, being the eldest agnatic descendant of James Scott, 1st Duke of Monmouth. When he was shown the deed, he threw it on the fire, remarking, "that might cause a lot of trouble".

Death
Buccleuch died at Bowhill House near Bowhill, Selkirkshire, in April 1884, aged 77, and was succeeded by his eldest son, William. He was buried in the family crypt of the Buccleuch Memorial Chapel in St. Mary's Episcopal Church, Dalkeith, Midlothian. The church is located on Dalkeith's High Street, at the entrance to Dalkeith Country Park.

Ancestry

See also
 Duke of Buccleuch's Hunt
 Duke of Buccleuch Collection
 James Scott, Duke of Monmouth
 Royal bastard

References

External links

Cricinfo: Lord Drumlanrig

1806 births
1884 deaths
Lords Privy Seal
Garter Knights appointed by William IV
Lord-Lieutenants of Midlothian
Lord-Lieutenants of Roxburghshire
Edinburgh Militia officers
Lord Presidents of the Council
Members of the Privy Council of the United Kingdom
107
205
People educated at Eton College
Alumni of St John's College, Cambridge
Chancellors of the University of Glasgow
W
English cricketers
Marylebone Cricket Club cricketers
Fellows of the Royal Society
Scottish Episcopalians
Members of the Canterbury Association
19th-century Scottish landowners
19th-century Scottish businesspeople
Surtees Society